Aboubakar Abdel-Aziz (born 27 July 1990) is a Chadian professional football player. He made one appearance for the Chad national football team.

See also
 List of Chad international footballers

References

External links
 

1990 births
Living people
Chadian footballers
Chad international footballers
People from N'Djamena
Association football midfielders